Bank of Aotearoa or Te Peeke o Aotearoa (The Bank of the North Island) was a bank established at Parawera in 1886 by the Māori King Tāwhiao. The bank was created to demonstrate Māori autonomy.

Cheques were issued by customers but the bank issued no banknotes. It provided banking and monetary services to Māori and sample banknotes bore the legend 'E whaimana ana tenei moni ki nga tangata katoa' (this money is valid for all people). There were branch offices at Maungatautari and Maungakawa. There is evidence that it remained in business until at least 1905.

When he was director of the Auckland War Memorial Museum G Stuart Park, anthropologist, published a note dated 1993 which may be read in full at this link. At the end of this note he records that while they had banknote samples printed it appears they were not issued, notes of the other banks were used instead along with the coins then current in New Zealand. Cheques issued on Te Peeke o Aotearoa let customers transfer large amounts of money without using cash.

References

Defunct banks of New Zealand
Companies disestablished in 1905
1905 disestablishments in New Zealand
Māori politics
Banks disestablished in 1905
Banks established in 1885
New Zealand companies established in 1885